In telecommunication, the term bandwidth compression has the following meanings: 
The reduction of the bandwidth needed to transmit a given amount of data in a given time.
The reduction of the time needed to transmit a given amount of data in a given bandwidth.

Bandwidth compression implies a reduction in normal bandwidth of an information-carrying signal without reducing the information content of the signal. This can be accomplished with lossless data compression techniques. For more information read the Increasing speeds section in the Modem article. Bandwidth Compression is a core feature of WAN Optimization appliances to improve bandwidth efficiency.

References
 Federal Standard 1037C 
 MIL-STD-188

Telecommunication theory